The 1994–95 Connecticut Huskies women's basketball team represented the University of Connecticut (UConn) during the 1994–95 NCAA Division I women's basketball season. The Huskies, led by Hall of Fame head coach Geno Auriemma in his 10th season at UConn, played their home games at Harry A. Gampel Pavilion and were members of the Big East Conference.

UConn finished their regular season with a record of 26–0, including 18–0 in the Big East to win the conference regular season championship. They also won the Big East tournament. Then, they won the NCAA Tournament, defeating Tennessee in the final to win their first national championship and complete their first undefeated season with a 35–0 record. UConn won all their games by double digits except for two in the NCAA Tournament.

Roster
Listed are the student athletes who were members of the 1994–95 team.

Schedule

|-
!colspan=12 style=""| Regular season

|-
!colspan=12 style=""|Big East tournament

|-
!colspan=12 style=""|NCAA tournament

Awards
 Rebecca Lobo
 Associated Press Athlete of the Year
 Wade Trophy
 Naismith College Player of the Year
 USBWA Women's National Player of the Year
 Associated Press Women's College Basketball Player of the Year
 NCAA basketball tournament Most Outstanding Player
 Big East Conference Women's Basketball Player of the Year

 Geno Auriemma
 Naismith College Coach of the Year
 USBWA Women's National Coach of the Year
 Associated Press College Basketball Coach of the Year
 Big East Conference Coach of the Year

References

External links
 Official site

UConn Huskies women's basketball seasons
NCAA Division I women's basketball tournament championship seasons
NCAA Division I women's basketball tournament Final Four seasons
Connecticut
Connecticut
Connect
Connect